Babel is a name used in the Hebrew Bible for the city of Babylon and may refer to:

Arts and media

Written works

Books
Babel (book), by Patti Smith
 Babel (2012 manga), by Narumi Shigematsu
 Babel (2017 manga), by Yūgo Ishikawa
Babel, a 1922 novel by John Cournos
Babel, a 1969 novel by Alan Burns (author)
Babel, a 2016 book by Zygmunt Bauman and Ezio Mauro
Babel, a 2018 book about linguistics by Gaston Dorren
 Babel-17, a science fiction novel by Samuel R. Delany
 Babel, or the Necessity of Violence, a 2022 novel by R. F. Kuang

Periodicals
 Babel (magazine), a magazine about linguistics
 Babel, a journal produced by the Australian Federation of Modern Language Teachers Associations
 Babel, a journal published by the International Federation of Translators
 Babel (newspaper), an Iraqi newspaper

Film and television

Star Trek
 "Babel" (Star Trek: Deep Space Nine), an episode of Star Trek: Deep Space Nine
 Babel (planet), a neutrally aligned planet in the Star Trek universe
 "Babel One", an episode of Star Trek: Enterprise
 "Journey to Babel", an episode of Star Trek (original series)

Other uses in film and television
 Babel (film), a 2006 film directed by Alejandro González Iñárritu
 Babel (TV series), a 2019 South Korean television series
 "Babel", an episode of Green Lantern: The Animated Series
 "Babel", an episode of Batman Beyond

Music

Albums
 Babel (D*Note album), 1993
 Babel (Mumford & Sons album), a 2012 album by Mumford & Sons, or its title track (see below)
 Babel (soundtrack), by Gustavo Santaolalla, the soundtrack album from the 2006 film
 Babel, an album by German electronic musician Klaus Schulze, 1987
 Babel, an album by Hughes de Courson, 2008
 Babel, an album by Gabriel Yacoub, 1997
 Babel, an album by Philip Catherine, 1980

Songs
 "Babel" (song), the title track of the album Babel by Mumford & Sons
 "Babel", a song from the album Heligoland by Massive Attack

Other uses in music
 Babel Label, a British record label
 Babel (Stravinsky), a 1944 cantata

In other media
 Babel (radio station), Uruguay
 Babel, a Turbo CD role-playing game released by Nippon Telenet

Places
 Babel, Carmarthenshire, a village in Wales
 Babel, Khuzestan, a village in Iran
 Babel Island, Tasmania, Australia
 Babel River, Alaska, United States
 Bangka Belitung, a province in Indonesia, abbreviated Babel
 Babil Governorate, in Iraq (named after Babylon) is sometimes transliterated as "Babel"
 Mount Babel (Alberta), Canada
 Mount Babel (Quebec), Canada

Science and technology
 5808 Babelʹ, a minor planet
 Babel (protocol), a routing protocol for wired, wireless, and hybrid IP mesh networks
 Babel (transcompiler), a JavaScript transcompiler
 Babel Middleware, open-source middleware for scientific computing
 GPSBabel, GPS file format conversion software
 OpenBabel, open-source chemical modeling software

Other
 Babel (surname)
 Babels, a volunteer translators network

See also
 Babel fish (disambiguation)
 Tower of Babel (disambiguation)
 
 
 Bab (disambiguation)
 Babbel, an online language learning platform
 Babble (disambiguation)
 Bable, an alternative name of the Asturian language of Spain
 Babol, a city in Iran